Hypatopa semela is a moth in the family Blastobasidae. It is found in Costa Rica.

The length of the forewings is about 8.1 mm. The forewings are pale brown intermixed with a few brown scales. The hindwings are translucent pale brown.

Etymology
The specific name refers to Semela, daughter of Cadmus, mother of Bacchus by Jupiter.

References

Moths described in 2013
Hypatopa